In statistics, projection pursuit regression (PPR) is a statistical model developed by Jerome H. Friedman and Werner Stuetzle which is an extension of additive models. This model adapts the additive models in that it first projects the data matrix of explanatory variables in the optimal direction before applying smoothing functions to these explanatory variables.

Model overview 
The model consists of linear combinations of ridge functions: non-linear transformations of linear combinations of the explanatory variables. The basic model takes the form

where xi is a 1 × p row of the design matrix containing the explanatory variables for example i, yi is a 1 × 1 prediction, {βj} is a collection of r vectors (each a unit vector of length p) which contain the unknown parameters, {fj} is a collection of r initially unknown smooth functions that map from ℝ → ℝ, and r is a hyperparameter. Good values for r can be determined through cross-validation or a forward stage-wise strategy which stops when the model fit cannot be significantly improved. As r approaches infinity and with an appropriate set of functions {fj}, the PPR model is a universal estimator, as it can approximate any continuous function in ℝp.

Model estimation 
For a given set of data , the goal is to minimize the error function

over the functions  and vectors . No method exists for solving over all variables at once, but it can be solved via alternating optimization. First, consider each  pair individually: Let all other parameters be fixed, and find a "residual", the variance of the output not accounted for by those other parameters, given by

The task of minimizing the error function now reduces to solving

for each j in turn. Typically new  pairs are added to the model in a forward stage-wise fashion.

Aside: Previously-fitted pairs can be readjusted after new fit-pairs are determined by an algorithm known as  backfitting, which entails reconsidering a previous pair, recalculating the residual given how other pairs have changed, refitting to account for that new information, and then cycling through all fit-pairs this way until parameters converge. This process typically results in a model that performs better with fewer fit-pairs, though it takes longer to train, and it is usually possible to achieve the same performance by skipping backfitting and simply adding more fits to the model (increasing r).

Solving the simplified error function to determine an  pair can be done with alternating optimization, where first a random  is used to project  in to 1D space, and then the optimal  is found to describe the relationship between that projection and the residuals via your favorite scatter plot regression method. Then if  is held constant, assuming  is once differentiable, the optimal updated weights  can be found via the  Gauss-Newton method—a quasi-Newton method in which the part of the Hessian involving the second derivative is discarded. To derive this, first  Taylor expand , then plug the expansion back in to the simplified error function  and do some algebraic manipulation to put it in the form

This is a  weighted least squares problem. If we solve for all weights  and put them in a diagonal matrix , stack all the new targets  in to a vector, and use the full data matrix  instead of a single example , then the optimal  is given by the closed-form

Then use that new  to update  by resolving the above, and continue this alternating process until  converges.

Discussion 
The PPR model takes the form of a basic additive model but with the additional  component, so each  fits a scatter plot of  vs the residual (unexplained variance) during training rather than using the raw inputs themselves. This constrains the problem of finding each  to low dimension, making it solvable with common least squares or spline fitting methods and sidestepping the curse of dimensionality during training. The directions  are chosen to optimize the fit of their corresponding ridge functions.

Note that because PPR attempts to fit projections of the data, it can be difficult to interpret the fitted model as a whole, because each input variable has been accounted for in a complex and multifaceted way. This can make the model more useful for prediction than for understanding the data, though visualizing individual ridge functions and considering which projections the model is discovering can yield some insight.

Advantages of PPR estimation 
It uses univariate regression functions instead of their multivariate form, thus effectively dealing with the curse of dimensionality
Univariate regression allows for simple and efficient estimation
Relative to generalized additive models, PPR can estimate a much richer class of functions
Unlike local averaging methods (such as k-nearest neighbors), PPR can ignore variables with low explanatory power.

Disadvantages of PPR estimation 
PPR requires examining an M-dimensional parameter space in order to estimate .
The model is often difficult to interpret

Extensions of PPR 
Alternate smoothers, such as the radial function, harmonic function and additive function, have been suggested and their performances vary depending on the data sets used.
Alternate optimization criteria have been used as well, such as standard absolute deviations and mean absolute deviations.
Ordinary least squares can be used to simplify calculations as often the data does not have strong non-linearities.
Sliced Inverse Regression (SIR) has been used to choose the direction vectors for PPR.
Generalized PPR combines regular PPR with iteratively reweighted least squares (IRLS) and a link function to estimate binary data.

PPR vs neural networks (NN) 
Both projection pursuit regression and neural networks models project the input vector onto a one-dimensional hyperplane and then apply a nonlinear transformation of the input variables that are then added in a linear fashion. Thus both follow the same steps to overcome the curse of dimensionality. The main difference is that the functions   being fitted in PPR can be different for each combination of input variables and are estimated one at a time and then updated with the weights, whereas in NN these are all specified upfront and estimated simultaneously.

Thus, PPR estimation is more straightforward than NN and the transformations of variables in PPR are data driven whereas in NN, these transformations are fixed.

See also
Projection pursuit

References 

Friedman, J.H. and Stuetzle, W. (1981) Projection Pursuit Regression. Journal of the American Statistical Association, 76, 817–823.
Hand, D., Mannila, H. and Smyth, P, (2001) Principles of Data Mining. MIT Press. 
Hall, P. (1988) Estimating the direction in which a data set is the most interesting, Probab. Theory Related Fields, 80, 51–77.
Hastie, T. J., Tibshirani, R. J. and Friedman, J.H. (2009). The Elements of Statistical Learning: Data Mining, Inference and Prediction. Springer. 
Klinke, S. and Grassmann, J. (2000) ‘Projection Pursuit Regression’ in Smoothing and Regression: Approaches, Computation and Application. Ed. Schimek, M.G.. Wiley Interscience.
Lingjarde, O. C. and Liestol, K. (1998) Generalized Projection Pursuit Regression. SIAM Journal of Scientific Computing, 20, 844-857.

Regression analysis